The following lists events that happened during 1857 in New Zealand.

Population
The estimated population of New Zealand at the end of 1857 is 57,150 Māori and 49,802 non-Māori.

Incumbents

Regal and viceregal
Head of State – Queen Victoria
Governor – Colonel Thomas Gore Browne

Government and law
The 2nd Parliament continues.
Speaker of the House – Sir Charles Clifford
Premier – Edward Stafford.
Minister of Finance – William Richmond
Chief Justice – William Martin resigns on 12 June. Hon George Arney is appointed on 2 September but does not arrive until the next year.

Events
7 February: The Auckland Register begins publishing. It ends in 1862.
14 May: The Taranaki News publishes its first issue. It becomes the Taranaki Daily News in 1885, and continues to publish .
24 September: The Hawke's Bay Herald and Ahuriri Advocate publishes its first issue. It becomes the Hawke's Bay Herald in 1858. The paper publishes weekly at first, becomes bi-weekly in 1861, and then daily in 1871. In 1937 it will merge with another paper to form the Hawke's Bay Herald-Tribune.
23 October: The Colonist publishes its first issue, in Nelson. The newspaper is published until 1920, when it is incorporated into The Nelson Evening Mail.

Undated
 Foundation of St Peter's School, Auckland, Auckland's first Catholic boys' secondary school.

Sport

Horse racing
Two existing clubs combine to form the Auckland Racing Club. The ARC holds its first meeting at Ellerslie Racecourse. (see also 1874)

Births
 20 August: James Carroll, politician.
 10 September: William Barber, Mayor of Wellington and politician.

Deaths

 16 July: Gilbert Mair, sailor and merchant trader

Unknown date
 Makea Te Vaerua Ariki, sovereign of the Cook Islands
 John Guard, one of the first European settlers in the South Island

See also
List of years in New Zealand
Timeline of New Zealand history
History of New Zealand
Military history of New Zealand
Timeline of the New Zealand environment
Timeline of New Zealand's links with Antarctica

References

External links